Hadrien Laroche (born 13 November 1963 in Paris, France) is a French writer.

Biography 
Born in Paris in 1963, Hadrien Laroche is a former student of the Ecole normale supérieure. He was visiting professor at Dartmouth College (1985-1986) and a fellow of the School of Criticism and Theory. There he met Jacques Derrida and Patricia Williams. He completed his doctorate in philosophy under Derrida in 1996 at the Ecole des Hautes Etudes en Sciences Sociales (EHESS); Derrida considered Laroche, his last doctoral student, as "one of the most talented and original thinkers of his generation."

Works
He has published essays on Jean Genet, Paul Cézanne, Marcel Duchamp ("La machine à signatures", Inculte #18, 2009), and three French-language novels—Les Orphelins (Paris: Allia/J'ai Lu, 2005), Les Heretiques (Paris: Flammarion, 2006), and La Restitution (Paris: Flammarion, 2009)]—which have placed him at the forefront of contemporary French writing.

For the centenary of Jean Genet's birth, Arsenal Pulp Press has published a translation of his essay The Last Genet, a writer in revolt, translated by David Homel. The book was presented at Nottingham Contemporary (UK). The book has been widely acclaimed by Bernard Henry Levy.

He has been correspondent for Les Inrockuptibles. He has done interviews with Bret Easton Ellis, Hubert Selby, Jr., and other French and American writers.

For the Maison des écrivains et des traducteurs étranger meetings, he has been the editor of the magazine for the meeting Le Caire/Vancouver (2008) and the meet no. 16 Quito/Dublin (2012). He has participated in a meeting no.6 and was the director of the centenary conference Pour Genet, at the Abbaye de Fontevraud in 2010.

English
 Marcel Duchamp: The signature's machine, trans. by Molleen Shilliday, in Breathless Days, 1959, 1960, editors: Serge Guilbaut, John O Brian (Duke University Press, 2017). .
 Orphans, trans. by Jan Steyn and Caite Dolan-Leach (Dalkey Archive Press, 2014). .
 The Last Genet: a writer in revolt, trans. by David Homel (Arsenal Pulp Press, 2010). .

French
Novels
 2009 La Restitution, Flammarion 
 2007 Les Hérétiques, Flammarion 
 2005 Les Orphelins,  Allia, J'ai Lu. 
Essays
 2014 Duchamp Déchets, Les hommes, les objets, la catastrophe, Editions du Regard 
 2009 La Machine à signatures, Marcel Duchamp, Incultes, #18
 2001 Face à la Pente, in Valère Novarina, Théâtres du verbe, Corti
 1997 Le Dernier Genet, Histoire des hommes infâmes, Seuil, Fiction & Cie, nommé pour le prix Fémina
Non-fiction
 1999 Le Miroir chinois, Le Seuil. 
poetry
 1990 au pire, mem/Arte Facts
Articles
 "Court traité de la décision en deux pages", in Jacques Derrida L'événement déconstruction, Les Temps modernes, n° 669-670, Gallimard,  juillet/déc. 2012.
 "Dans le tramway avec W.G Sebald", in Face à Sebald, édition inculte, 2011, p.p. 289-305.
 "Marcel Duchamp. La machine à signatures" in inculte, n° 18, 2009, p.p 41-65.

References

 https://web.archive.org/web/20160303201011/http://www.seuil.com/livre-9782020303484.htm
 http://www.nottinghamcontemporary.org/event/hadrien-laroche-last-genet-1968-1986 
 https://web.archive.org/web/20110207122741/http://maisonecrivainsetrangers.com/
 https://web.archive.org/web/20141229161721/http://www.maisonecrivainsetrangers.com/Hadrien-Laroche-572.html
 http://www.arsenalpulp.com/contributorinfo.php?index=291 
 :fr:Hadrien Laroche
 http://www.dailymotion.com/video/xa0ife_hadrien-laroche-restitution-mediapa_news#.UMDji46PtOw
 http://www.franceculture.fr/personne-hadrien-laroche.html
 https://www.theglobeandmail.com/arts/books-and-media/the-last-genet-a-writer-in-revolt-by-hadrien-laroche/article4349837/
 http://www.nottinghamcontemporary.org/event/hadrien-laroche-last-genet-1968-1986 
 http://www.magazine-litteraire.com/mensuel/437/hadrien-laroche-interrogation-radicale-responsabilite-01-12-2004-15501 
 http://pigiconi.blogspot.ie/2011/07/le-dernier-genet-de-hadrien-laroche.html

1963 births
Writers from Paris
20th-century French novelists
21st-century French novelists
French poets
Dartmouth College faculty
École Normale Supérieure alumni
Living people
French LGBT poets
French LGBT novelists